Mutzel or Mützel is a surname. Notable people with the name include:

 Gustav Mützel (1839–1893), German artist, famous for his mammal and bird paintings
 Michael Mutzel (born 1979), German football midfielder
 Petra Mutzel, German computer scientist
 Sebastian Mützel (born 1989), German footballer

German-language surnames